Isma miosticta is a butterfly in the family Hesperiidae. It was described by Lionel de Nicéville in 1891. It is found in the Indomalayan realm (Burma, Thailand, Langkawi, Malaysia, Borneo, Bangka, Sipora and Siberut).

References

External links

Isma at Markku Savela's Lepidoptera and Some Other Life Forms

Hesperiidae genera
Butterflies described in 1891